Cheuk-Yin Wong (born 1941) is former president of the Overseas Chinese Physics Association (OCPA) and a fellow of the American Physics Society (APS).  He received his Ph.D. in 1966 from Princeton University under thesis advisor John Wheeler.  He has worked at the Oak Ridge National Laboratory since 1966.

References
Cheuk-Yin Wong, (1994). Introduction to High-Energy Heavy-Ion Collisions, World Scientific Pub Co Inc. 

1941 births
Living people
Chinese physicists
American people of Chinese descent
Fellows of the American Physical Society
Date of birth missing (living people)
Princeton University alumni